Miss International 2013, the 53rd Miss International pageant, was held on December 17, 2013 at the Shinagawa Prince Hotel Hall in Tokyo, Japan. Alejandra Andreu, Miss International 2008, crowned Bea Santiago of the Philippines at the end of the event. This was the second consecutive year Japan hosted the pageant.

The incumbent titleholder Miss International 2012 Ikumi Yoshimatsu of Japan was barred from attending the event due to her involvement in a scandal where a media executive Genichi Taniguchi allegedly harassed and intimidated Ms. Yoshimatsu for not signing on to a talent agency with ties to the Japanese Yakuza or underworld.

Background
On September 6, 2013, it was announced by Akemi Shimomura, the president of the International Cultural Association, that the 2013 pageant will be held in Shinagawa Prince Hotel Hall, Tokyo, Japan on December 17, 2013.

Results

Placements

§ - Fan Vote Winner

Major Special Awards

Order of announcements

Best In Debate

Best In Speech

Miss. Beauty With Voice

Contestants

Notes

Debuts

Returns

Last competed in 1996:
 
Last competed in 2004:
 
 
Last competed in 2010:
 
Last competed in 2011:

Designations
  - Yaritza Rivera was appointed to represent El Salvador, she was previously Miss Earth El Salvador 2012.
  - Madli Vilsar was appointed to represent Estonia, she was previously Miss Estonia 2011.
  - Sigrún Eva Ármannsdóttir was appointed to represent Iceland, she was previously Ungfru Islands 2011.
  - Charissa Chong was appointed to represent Malaysia, she was previously Miss Global Malaysia 2012.
  - Lucero Montemayor was appointed to represent Mexico, she was the 1st runner-up at the Nuestra Belleza México 2012 pageant.
  - Nathalie den Dekker was appointed to represent Netherlands by Katia Maes, national director of Miss International in Netherlands, she was previously Miss Nederland 2012.
  - Maria Gracia Figueroa was appointed to represent Peru, she was previously Miss Earth Peru 2011.
  - Katarzyna Oracka was appointed to represent Poland, she was in the Top 10 at the Miss Polonia 2012 pageant.
  - Margaryta Gorbyk was appointed as Miss International Ukraine 2013 after a casting call took place.
  - Lô Thị Hương Trâm was appointed to compete the peageant by Elite Vietnam. She crowned Miss Jewelry Vietnam 2013.

Replacements
  - Sarah Ainsley Harrison was appointed to represent Canada after the original representative of Canada, Siera Bearchell could not compete after not being able to fulfill her contractual obligations required by the Miss Universe Canada Organization , Harrison was previously Miss Universe Canada 2013 Contestant.
  - Deedee Zibara was replaced by Layla Yarak, the 1st runner-up after Zibara could not compete due to some serious issues between her and the committee.
  - Jara Rodriguez was replaced by Araceli Carrilero Martinez, the 1st runner-up after Rodriguez gave up the title.
  - Due to Maeva Simonin's inability to participate, Ohana Huber represented Tahiti at Miss international 2013.
  - Sana Sallah is originally Miss International Tunisia. Due to Sana's higher studies abroad in Moscow, Sondes Zamouri replaced Sallah to compete. She was the runner-up at Miss Tunisia 2013.
  - Sophie Moulds was replaced by Elizabeth Greenham. She was an Miss Universe Great Britain 2011 contestant.

Withdrawals
  - Zaida Schoop, due to lack of funding & sponsorship.
 - No contest held
  - No contest held
  - No contest held
  - Josefine Emilie Egebjerg, undisclosed reasons.
  - Christelle Roca, undisclosed reasons.
  - Natalia Coto, sent back to Honduras because the national director failed to inform the Japanese committee that she was replacing Jennifer Valle.
  - No contest held
  - Svetlana Goldberga, undisclosed reasons.
  - Shiksha Matabadul, undisclosed reasons.
  - Antonia Shinana, undisclosed reasons.
  - Simerene Rabot, due to failing to meet the age requirements.
  - Ahu Agisbas, due to failing to meet the age requirements.
  - No contest held

Crossovers
Contestants who previously competed or will compete at other beauty pageants:

Miss Universe
 2011:  - Madli Vilsar
 2012:  - Nathalie den Dekker
 2017:  - Carmen Isabel Muñoz Guzmán
Miss World
 2011:  - Sigrún Eva Ármannsdóttir
 2012:  - Nathalie den Dekker (Top 15)
2015: - Anu Namshir
Miss Earth
 2011:  - Maria Gracia Figueroa
 2012:  - Yaritza Rivera
 2014:  - Andrea Neu (Miss Earth-Air/1st runner-up)
 2015:  - Sara Guerrero 
Miss Globe
 2013:  - Charissa Chong
Miss Grand International
 2014:  - Corrine Semedo Furtado
Miss Supranational
 2010:  - Nathalie den Dekker
 2012:  - Sigrún Eva Ármannsdóttir (Semi-finalist)
 2014:  - Ekaterina Sarafanova
 2014:  - Ana Claudia Ornelas
Miss Tourism International
 2010:  - Nathalie den Dekker (Winner)
 2014:  - Andrea Rojas
Miss Tourism Queen International
 2013:  - Casey Radley (Oceania Queen)
 2013:  - Ana Cláudia Ornelas (4th runner-up)
 2016: - Anu Namshir (winner)
Miss Tourism Queen of the Year International
 2010:  - Nathalie den Dekker (Semi-finalist)
 2012:  - Bea Santiago (Semi-finalist)
World Miss University
 2014:  - Charissa Chong
Face of Beauty International
 2014:  - Xiao-wen Chen (4th runner-up, Best in Talent)
Reinado Internacional del Café
 2014:  - Carmen Isabel Muñoz Guzmán
Reina Mundial del Banano
 2014:  - Xiao-wen Chen
Reina de la Costa Maya
 2013:  - Andrea Rojas
Miss Turismo Latino
 2012:  - Sara Guerrero (1st runner-up)
Miss Mesoamérica
 2012:  - Ashley Beth Perez (1st runner-up)
Top Model of the World
 2012:  - Yaritza Rivera
Supermodel International
 2015:  - Anu Namshir (1st runner-up, Photogenic Model, Best Catwalk)

References

External links
 Official website

2013
2013 beauty pageants
Beauty pageants in Japan
2013 in Tokyo